Stephen Sharer is an American internet personality. He publishes a vlog on YouTube.

Early life and career
Sharer spent his childhood creating video content and performing at local events with friends. Sharer uploaded his first YouTube video titled "Unboxing 2 Hoverboards!" and was encouraged to continually upload videos to the site. In 2017, Sharer began creating YouTube videos full-time with his brother Carter Sharer. His content includes videos of his day-to-day activities and other videos such as stunts, experiments, challenges and adventures. He is based in Los Angeles which is the setting of many of his videos.

The channel experienced rapid growth, amassing 2 million subscribers within a year and reached 6 million subscribers in two years. He was featured in Newsweek, CBS Local and Yahoo Finance. As of 2022, his channel has engaged over 4.8 billion viewers with almost every video going mega viral. Sharer created a music video, "“Share The Love”" which became his most viewed video. He produced two more music videos, "Jump In!" and "Snow Day", after the success of "“Share The Love”".

Other work
Sharer has been a guest speaker at CVX Live, VidSummit and VidCon conferences, to discuss Youtube and social media growth methods. In 2019, he granted the wish of a terminally ill child, eight-year-old James through the Make a Wish Foundation and took him on a backyard adventure in search of the “Pond Monster”, a character that has been the focal point of numerous videos. Stephen has also been able to connect with his fans through interviews with news outlets like Sweety High, Young Hollywood

References

Living people
American YouTubers
Year of birth missing (living people)